The Egypt lobby in the United States is a collection of lawyers, public relation firms  and professional lobbyists paid directly by the government of Egypt to lobby the public and government of the United States on behalf of the interests of the government of Egypt.

A key goal of Egypt's lobbyists is to secure a large allocation of foreign aid; more than  $50 billion in American aid has gone to Egypt since 1975.  According to ProPublica, this massive amount of American aid has "enabled" the Egyptian government to postpone democratic reform.

According to ProPublica, in 2007-8 Egypt ranked sixth in a list of the number of meetings between lobbyists for foreign governments and congressmen.

According to The New York Times, in 2010 three of the most notable lobbyists Tony Podesta, Robert L. Livingston and Toby Moffett scored a large success on behalf of the government of Egypt by persuading American senators to stop passage of a bill in the United States Senate calling on Egypt to "curtail human rights abuses."  Their success is credited with condoning the abuses that brought about the 2011 Egyptian revolution.  In the lobbying campaign, former congressman from Connecticut Toby Moffat  told his former colleagues that the bill "would be viewed as an insult" and that it would be wrong to insult an important ally.   "We were just saying to them, 'Don't do this now to our friends in Egypt,' " he said.  In the wake of President Mubarak's resignation, lobbyists Podesta, Moffat and Livingston continue to share "a joint, multimillion-dollar (lobbying) contract with Egypt."

References

Egypt–United States relations
Lobbying in the United States